The Stellar Astra is an American ultralight trike that was designed by Allistair Wilson and produced by Stellar Aircraft of Bloomfield, Indiana. When it was available the aircraft was supplied as a complete ready-to-fly-aircraft. As of 2013 the company appears to be out of business and production complete.

Design and development
The Astra was derived from a P&M Aviation trike design and intended to comply with the US light-sport aircraft category, although it does not appear on the Federal Aviation Administration's accepted LSA list.

The Astra features a cable-braced hang glider-style high-wing, weight-shift controls, a two-seats-in-tandem open cockpit with a cockpit fairing, tricycle landing gear with wheel pants and a single engine in pusher configuration.

The aircraft is made from bolted-together aluminum tubing, with its double surface wing covered in Dacron sailcloth. Its  span wing is supported by a single tube-type kingpost and uses an "A" frame weight-shift control bar. Powerplants that were factory available were the twin cylinder, air-cooled, two-stroke, dual-ignition  Rotax 503, the four cylinder, air and liquid-cooled, four-stroke, dual-ignition  Rotax 912UL and   Rotax 912ULS and the twin cylinder, air-cooled, four-stroke, dual-ignition  HKS 700E engine.

The aircraft was produced under contract for Stellar Aircraft in India by Albatross Flying Systems, who also marketed the design in Asia as the Cruiser.

Specifications (Astra)

References

External links
Company website archives at Archive.org
Photo of the Stellar Astra

2000s United States sport aircraft
2000s United States ultralight aircraft
Single-engined pusher aircraft
Ultralight trikes